DS2 may refer to:

Video games 
 Dark Seed II, a 1995 adventure game
 Dark Souls II, a 2014 action role-playing video game
 Dead Space 2, a 2011 survival horror third-person shooter game
 Death Stranding 2 (stylized as DS2), the upcoming sequel to Death Stranding
 Dungeon Siege II, a 2005 action role-playing game
 Darksiders II, a 2012 action role-playing hack and slash game
 SimCity DS 2, 2008 city-building game for the Nintendo DS

Other uses 
 DS2 (album), a 2015 album by American rapper Future
 C-Net DS2, a 1986 bulletin board system (BBS) for the Commodore 64 microcomputer
 Datsun DS-2, a 1951 car in the Datsun DS series
 DS-2, a type of Soviet satellite including Kosmos 1

See also 
 DSS (disambiguation)
 DSDS
 2DS

References